Hope is located in Rapides Parish, Louisiana, in the rural community of McNutt, Louisiana.  It was added to the National Register of Historic Places on December 13, 1984.  It is also a contributing building in the McNutt Rural Historic District.

It was listed as one result of a study of 10 Neo-Classical farm-plantation houses along Bayou Rapides.  As for several of the others (Eden, China Grove, Geneva, Island Home, Longview), Hope was modified by addition of hood along its original gallery, termed a false gallery, which provides additional protection from the rain, detracting somewhat but not greatly from its original appearance.

References

Houses on the National Register of Historic Places in Louisiana
Houses completed in 1880
Houses in Rapides Parish, Louisiana
National Register of Historic Places in Rapides Parish, Louisiana